The 1934 Campeonato Nacional de Fútbol Profesional was Chilean first tier’s 2nd season. Magallanes were the  tournament’s champions, winning their second ever title.

Scores

Standings

Topscorer

References

External links
ANFP 
RSSSF Chile 1934

Primera División de Chile seasons
Primera
Chile